The badminton competition at the 1982 Commonwealth Games took place in Brisbane, Australia from 30 September until 9 October 1982.

Medallists

Results

Men's singles

Women's singles

Men's doubles

Women's doubles

Mixed doubles

Mixed team

Semifinals

Bronze medal play-off

Final

References

1982 Commonwealth Games events
1982
Commonwealth Games
Commonwealth Games